Amaicha del Valle is a settlement in Tucumán Province in northern Argentina. It is located in the Tafi del Valle department, in the northwestern province of Tucuman, Argentina, 164 km from the provincial capital, San Miguel de Tucumán and 57 km from the departmental capital, Tafi del Valle.

It communicates with the city of San Miguel de Tucuman by the Ruta Nacional 38 and Route 307.
It lies east of the RN 40, from which it is accessed in two ways: on the north by RP 357 (14 km), or from the south via Route 307 from the town of Santa María, Catamarca (20 km).

Geography
It is located in the area corresponding to the province of Tucuman Valles Calchaquíes, at a height of 2000 m.

Climate

Photo gallery

References

Populated places in Tucumán Province